Dishdogz is a 2006 American film starring Luke Perry and Haylie Duff and directed by Mikey Hilb.

Plot
When Kevin (Marshall Allman) looks for a way to escape his back-breaking summer job, he enlists in the kitchen at an extreme summer camp with the hopes of spending his breaks on the half-pipe. But Kevin gets more than he bargained for when he teams up with his fellow extreme skateboarder dishwashers, The Dishdogz. He'll have to be more radical than the competition and win the heart of the girl (Haylie Duff) if he's going to keep up with his new crew. But before he does, he'll have to get all his work done, if he's to avoid a thrashing from his surly boss Tony (Luke Perry), who's hiding a secret that's truly old school. In the end he learns the true meaning of skateboarding and how to never give up.

Cast

References

External links
 

2006 films
Skateboarding films
2000s action drama films
American action drama films
2006 drama films
2000s English-language films
2000s American films